Mefou-et-Afamba is a department of Centre Province in Cameroon. The department covers an area of 3,358 km and in 2001 had a total population of 89,805. The capital of the department lies at Mfou.

Subdivisions 
The department is divided administratively into 8 communes, and in turn into villages:
 Afanloum
 Awaé
 Edzendouan
 Esse
 Mfou
 Nkolafamba 
 Olanguina
 Soa

See also 
 Mefou National Park

References 

Departments of Cameroon
Centre Region (Cameroon)